The Light at the End is a 1986 vampire novel by John Skipp & Craig Spector which became a New York Times bestseller and is often credited as the book that started the splatterpunk movement.

Story
The book takes place in the 1980s punk subculture of New York City. While riding the subway, a young street punk named Rudy Pasko is attacked and turned by an old vampire. Drunk off his new power, Rudy takes to the night-life and goes on a murder spree, but his actions lead to the formation of a posse composed of several local messengers, artists, and working class citizens who devise a plan to hunt him through the New York underground.

Influences
According to Joss Whedon, the novel was the inspiration for Spike, the punk vampire on Buffy the Vampire Slayer. Coincidentally, in the Season Five episode, "Fool For Love" there is a scene in which Spike fights a hunter in the subways of New York.

Re-release
For its 25th anniversary, the novel was re-released as an e-book from Crossroad Press on October 31, 2010.

References

Vampire novels
1986 American novels
Collaborative novels